Lalbagh is a metro station on the Green Line of the Namma Metro serving the Basavanagudi area of Bangalore, India. It was opened to the public on 18 June 2017.

It services Lalbagh Botanical Garden.

Station layout

Entry/Exits

See also
List of Namma Metro stations
Transport in Karnataka
List of metro systems
List of rapid transit systems in India

References

External links

 Bangalore Metro Rail Corporation Ltd. (Official site) 
 UrbanRail.Net – descriptions of all metro systems in the world, each with a schematic map showing all stations.

Namma Metro stations
Railway stations in India opened in 2015
2015 establishments in Karnataka
Railway stations in Bangalore